Abuso di potere (internationally released as Shadows Unseen) is a 1972 Italian crime film directed by  Camillo Bazzoni. The film, despite the original plot, contains several references to actual events, such as the killing of journalist Mauro De Mauro.

Cast 
 Frederick Stafford	as	Commissioner Luca Miceli
 Marilù Tolo	as 	Simona
 Franco Fabrizi	as 	Commissioner Resta
 Reinhard Kolldehoff	as	Chief of Police (credited as René Kolldehoff)
 Raymond Pellegrin	as	Nicola Dalò
 Umberto Orsini	as 	Enrico Gagliardi
 Corrado Gaipa	as 	Günther Rosenthal
 Claudio Gora	as	District Attorney
 Ninetto Davoli	as	Giorgio the Pusher
 Judy Winter	as 	Rosaria Cruciani
 Elio Zamuto	as	Sgt. Mortesi
 Guido Leontini	as	Turi Delogo
 Quinto Parmeggiani	as 	Gagliardi's editor-in-chief
 Gianfranco Barra	as	Fish Seller

References

External links

1972 films
Poliziotteschi films
Mafia films
Films directed by Camillo Bazzoni
Films set in Sicily
1972 crime films
Films scored by Riz Ortolani
West German films
1970s Italian films